Tega may refer to:

Tega, a village in Pănătău, Buzău County, Muntenia, Romania
Tega Brain, Australian-born digital artist and environmental engineer
Thermal and Evolved Gas Analyzer (TEGA)
Terra Galega (TeGa), a coalition of centrist and Galician nationalist political parties